Old Los Angeles is a 1948 American Western film directed by Joseph Kane and written by Gerald Drayson Adams and Clements Ripley. The film stars Wild Bill Elliott, John Carroll, Catherine McLeod, Joseph Schildkraut, Andy Devine and Estelita Rodriguez.

Plot
When Bill Stockton arrives in the town of Old Los Angeles to meet his brother he quickly figures out that the outlaws rule. He is then confronted with the reality that his brother Larry has been murdered for gold. This sets him off on a quest to avenge his brother's death which comes hand in hand with even more trouble.

Cast
Wild Bill Elliott as Bill Stockton 
John Carroll as Johnny Morrell
Catherine McLeod as Marie Marlowe
Joseph Schildkraut as Luis Savarin
Andy Devine as Sam Bowie
Estelita Rodriguez as Estelita Del Rey
Virginia Brissac as Señora Del Rey
Grant Withers as Marshal Ed Luckner
Tito Renaldo as Tonio Del Rey
Roy Barcroft as Clyborne
Henry Brandon as Larry Stockton
Julian Rivero as Diego
Earle Hodgins as Horatius P. Gassoway
Augie Gomez as Miguel

References

External links
 

1948 films
American Western (genre) films
1948 Western (genre) films
American black-and-white films
Republic Pictures films
Films directed by Joseph Kane
Films with screenplays by Clements Ripley
1940s English-language films
1940s American films